Vladichthys gloverensis is a species of toadfish known only from the Atlantic Coast of Belize and Honduras, where it is found on reefs. The generic name honours the toadfish expert Vladimir "Vlad" Walters (1927-1987) while the specific name denotes Glover's Reef in Belize.

References

Batrachoididae
Monotypic fish genera
Fish described in 1973